Vernon Troylee Wilson (January 19, 1931 – April 20, 2016) was an American athlete. He competed in the men's high jump at the 1956 Summer Olympics.

References

External links
 

1931 births
2016 deaths
Athletes (track and field) at the 1956 Summer Olympics
American male high jumpers
Olympic track and field athletes of the United States
Place of birth missing